This article lists governors that have ruled the Indonesian province of South Sumatra.

References

Bibliography